Pacheco Pereira is Portuguese surname. Notable people with the surname include:
Duarte Pacheco Pereira (c. 1460-1533), Portuguese sea captain, explorer and cartographer
José Pacheco Pereira (born 1949), Portuguese historian, professor and political analyst

See also
Pacheco
Pereira (surname)

Compound surnames
Portuguese-language surnames